Winter in Rio (Prezimiti u Riju) is a Croatian film directed by Davor Žmegač. It was released in 2002.

Cast  
Mustafa Nadarević as Grga  
Leona Paraminski as Monika  
Sven Medvešek  as Rafael  
Ranko Zidarić    
Zarko Savić as Panco  
Enes Vejzović as Mali  
Sasa Anočić as Boris  
Vera Zima as Danica   
Matej Busić as Konobar  
Marijan Crtalić as Luka  
Igor Damjanović as Kradljivac  
Marija Kohn as Bakica  
Zlatko Kopljar as Mislav  
Vladimir Krstulović as Stari Kloser  
Tanja Kursar as Konobarica

External links
 

2002 films
2000s Croatian-language films
Croatian drama films
Films set in Zagreb
2002 drama films